Thomas Hanford (July 22, 1621 – 1693) was a founding settler of Norwalk, Connecticut. He was the first minister in Norwalk, and continued in charge of the settlement's church for forty-one years, until his death in 1693. In addition to his spiritual leadership, he also served as the civic leader and school teacher of the settlement.

Early life and family 
He was born in Fremington (near Barnstable), Devonshire, England, on July 22, 1621, the son of Theophilus Jeffrey Hanford and Eglin Hatherly.

Life in America 
His mother, Eglin Hatherly Hanford, with Thomas' sisters, Margaret and Elizabeth, departed from London aboard the ship Planter on April 8, 1635. They arrived in Boston on June 7, 1635.

Thomas followed his mother at a later time in order to finish his studies in England. However, it appears that he did not finish in England, as he completed his studies in Massachusetts Bay Colony with Charles Chauncy, who later became the second president of Harvard University.

By 1643, he was in Scituate, Massachusetts, which was founded by his mother's brother, Timothy Hatherly.

He became a freeman of Massachusetts in 1650. In 1651 he went to Roxbury, to teach school. He taught for four months, but became discouraged by his students and quit in June 1652, citing ill health.

Life in Norwalk 
In 1652, Hanford, being "an orthodox and approved minister," was invited to join the settlement at Norwalk as the first minister of the First Congregational Church. He was ordained in Hartford on May 18, 1654. The town gave him a lot of four acres, and built him a house. He was also given an island by a Winnipauk Indian named Sagamore, which today is called Sheffield Island.

He is listed on the Founders Stone bearing the names of the founding settlers of Norwalk in the East Norwalk Historical Cemetery.

References 

1621 births
1693 deaths
Burials in East Norwalk Historical Cemetery
Founding settlers of Norwalk, Connecticut
17th-century New England Puritan ministers
People from North Devon (district)
Settlers of Connecticut
First settlers of New England